The Block 0-100 East Franklin Street Historic District is a national historic district located at Richmond, Virginia. It is located west of downtown.  The district encompasses 21 contributing buildings built between about 1840 and 1920. The district is characterized by numerous mid- to late-19th century brick town houses in a variety of popular 19th-century architectural styles including Queen Anne, Italianate, and Greek Revival.

It was added to the National Register of Historic Places in 1980.

References

Historic districts on the National Register of Historic Places in Virginia
Italianate architecture in Virginia
Greek Revival houses in Virginia
Queen Anne architecture in Virginia
Buildings and structures in Richmond, Virginia
National Register of Historic Places in Richmond, Virginia